Alfred Fleischer was a German World War I flying ace credited with six confirmed aerial victories. He served as a grenadier until late 1916 before transferring to aviation and becoming a fighter pilot. In an unusual turn of events, he became friends with an American pilot he shot down.

Fleischer would return to Germany's service during World War II, commanding air bases in Russia, Hungary, and Yugoslavia. Postwar, he would move to the United States with the aid of the pilot he had downed in World War I.

Early life
Alfred Fleischer was born on 16 March 1895 in Graudenz, Silesia, in present day Poland; at the time he was born, it was part of the German Empire.

World War I
Fleischer began his military service with the 1st (Emperor Alexander) Guards Grenadiers in 1914. He served with them through the Battle of the Somme and the Battle of Verdun, and was wounded in late 1916. He then transferred to the Luftstreitkräfte, becoming a fighter pilot with Jagdstaffel 17. He was posted to Jasta 17 on 30 May 1918, and scored his first aerial victory on 29 June 1918.

Fleischer's second victory came on 1 August 1918. He was in a flight of five on a morning patrol at 14,000 feet. A Nieuport 28 that had been attacking a German observation two-seater dove to assault Jasta 17's flight commander. The Nieuport wounded the German pilot and left his plane smoking. In turn, Fleischer attacked to rescue his flight commander. The Nieuport zoomed vertical to avoid being shot at, but Fleischer managed to pepper him with machine gun fire. The Nieuport did a wingover to the left to escape, and Fleischer followed. The two of them circled downwards to less than 1,500 feet altitude. As Fleischer lined up a shot from about 50 yards, he realized the Nieuport's engine had quit. The Nieuport crashlanded. Later, Fleischer and Lieutenant Clifford L. McElvain of the 27th Aero Squadron met and cordially shook hands. It was the beginning of a 45 year friendship.

Fleischer went on to score four more confirmed victories by war's end, and was awarded the Iron Cross First Class.

List of aerial victories
See also Aerial victory standards of World War I

Confirmed victories are numbered and listed chronologically. Unconfirmed victories are denoted by "u/c" and are listed by date.

Post World War I
Like all Fokker D.VII pilots, Fleischer had to hand over his plane at war's end. He hated to do that, and felt bitterly betrayed by Germany's defeat.

Fleischer's life between the world wars is unknown. However, he returned to military service for World War II. As an oberst, he commanded air bases in Russia, Hungary, and Yugoslavia. Meanwhile, his old opponent McElvain served in the United States Army Air Force as a colonel.

After World War II, McElvain arranged for Fleischer and his wife and son to move to Chicago. McElvain owned a mortgage firm, and hired the younger Fleischer to work for him. Alfred Fleischer would retire back to Germany in 1961, dying there on 11 June 1978. Fleischer’s son Gunter became an American citizen and married a girl named Denise from the Belgian Consulate in Chicago. They had two children Eric and a daughter. Gunter worked as a property valuer for a Mortgage company before retiring to Florida.

References
 Norman Franks, Frank W. Bailey, Russell Guest (1993)Above the Lines: The Aces and Fighter Units of the German Air Service, Naval Air Service and Flanders Marine Corps, 1914–1918.  Grub Street Publishing. , .
 Norman Franks, Greg VanWyngarden (2004). Fokker D VII Aces of World War 1, Part 2: Aircraft of the Aces 63: Osprey Aircraft of the Aces. Osprey Publishing. , .

Endnotes

People from Grudziądz
People from West Prussia
German World War I flying aces
1895 births
1978 deaths
Prussian Army personnel
Luftstreitkräfte personnel
Luftwaffe personnel of World War II